Suzlon Energy Limited (NSE:SUZLONEQ, BSE:532667) is an Indian multinational wind turbine manufacturer based in Pune, India. It was formerly ranked by MAKE as the world's fifth largest wind turbine supplier.

History 
In 1995, founder Tulsi Tanti was managing a 20-employee textile company. Due to the erratic availability of power locally, and its rising costs, the highest business expenditure after the raw materials was electricity. The cost of electricity also offset any profits made by the company. After providing electricity for his own company, Tanti moved into wind energy production as a way to secure the textile company's energy needs, and founded Suzlon Energy. Suzlon adopted a business model wherein clients would be responsible for 25% of the up-front capital investment and Suzlon would arrange the remaining 75% on loan. Initially, banks were hesitant to fund loans for this model, but by 2008, many Indian banks started financing wind power projects for Suzlon clients.

In 2001, Tanti sold off the textile business; Suzlon was still actively run by Tulsi Tanti, now in the role of Chairman, Suzlon Group.
In 2003, Suzlon got its first order in USA from DanMar & Associates to supply 24 turbines in southwestern Minnesota. Also in 2003 Suzlon set up an office in Beijing.

Suzlon Rotor Corporation in 2006 began producing the blades in Pipestone, Minnesota in the United States.  Among its clients is Wind Capital Group.

In the year 2006, Suzlon reached a definitive agreement for acquisition of Belgian firm Hansen Transmissions, specializing in gearboxes for wind turbines, for $565 million. In 2007, the company purchased a controlling stake in Germany's Senvion (then operating as REpower Systems) which valued the firm at US$1.6 billion.

In June 2007, Suzlon had signed a contract with Edison Mission Energy (EME) of US for delivery of 150 wind turbines of 2.1 megawatts in 2008 and a similar volume to be delivered in 2009. EME had an option not to purchase the 150 turbines due to be delivered in 2009, which it has chosen to exercise.

In November 2009, the company decided to sell 35% stake of Hansen for $370 million as part of its debt restructuring program, through placing new shares. It appointed Bank of America Merrill Lynch and Morgan Stanley as the managers and book runners for the same.

In January 2011, Suzlon received an order worth US$1.28 billion for building 1000 megawatts of wind energy projects from the Indian branch of the Lord Swaraj Paul-owned Caparo Energy Ltd.

In May 2011, Suzlon announced returning to profitability after the financial crisis of 2009.

In the same month, it also achieved full control of its German subsidiary REpower Systems (now Senvion) by acquiring the remaining 5% stake held by minority shareholders that resisted the takeover. The takeover was completed through the squeeze-out procedure by paying EUR 63 million.

It has to redeem 500 million worth of FCCB's (foreign currency convertible bonds) in 2012 in tranches of 300 million in June and 200 million in October respectively.
In line with the previously announced strategy to dispose of non-critical group assets to reduce long-term debt, Suzlon Chairman said that Suzlon Energy, will sell stake in its China manufacturing unit to China Power New Energy Development Company Limited for 3.4 billion rupees ($60 million).

On 30 November 2013 the Suzlon Group subsidiary REpower Systems (now Senvion SE) won an Engineering, Procurement and Construction (EPC) contract from Mitsui & Co (Australia) Ltd to deliver 52 wind turbines with a total rated output of 106.6 MW for the Bald Hills Wind Farm in Victoria, Australia.

As of August 2014, Suzlon's debt was over  8000 crores. On 22 January 2015, Suzlon announced the sale of Senvion SE, its wholly owned subsidiary, to Centerbridge Partners, a private equity firm in a deal valued at  7200 crores. The deal is expected to ease Suzlon's debt burden. In a further equity infusion, Dilip Shanghvi Family and Associates (DSA), run by Dilip Shanghvi, the founder and managing director of Sun Pharmaceuticals, agreed to purchase a 23 percent stake in Suzlon for a sum of 1800 crores.  The deal will see Tanti's holding shrink to 24 percent, but management control will still remain with the Tanti family. Its total borrowings stood at 11430.76 crore in FY16 from 17810.96 crore FY15.

On 17 January 2017, Suzlon Energy achieved 10,000 megawatts installed wind energy milestone in India. Suzlon's 10,000 MW of wind installation is capable of powering over 5 million households per annum and offsets approximately 21.5 million tonnes of carbon dioxide (CO2) emission annually which is equivalent to planting over 1500 million trees.

To date, the company has fifteen manufacturing facilities and a workforce of over 8,000 employees globally.

The stock price of the company in the Indian stock exchanges peaked in 2008 but recovered from the fall in 2009-2010.

Wind parks 
Globally, Suzlon has installed over 17,000 MW of wind power capacity in 18 countries.

India 
Suzlon crossed 11,000 megawatts of cumulative installations in India. 
Suzlon has cumulatively added over 11000 megawatts of wind power capacity for over 1,700 customers in India across 40 sites in eight States. 
Suzlon accounts for nearly one-third of the country's total wind installations.

Its notable installations in India include:
 The 1064 MW Jaisalmer Wind Park in Rajasthan.
 The 1100 MW wind park in the Kutch district, Gujarat, with plans to expand it to 2000 MW in the next four to six years. As of February 2015, this is the largest wind park in Asia at a single location.
The 650 MW wind park in the Sakri Taluka of Dhule District of Maharashtra. And planning to reach 1000 MW.
 A 584 MW wind park in the Eastern Ghats, (Tamil Nadu).
 The 210 MW Vankusawade Wind Park near the Koyna reservoir in the Satara district of Maharashtra.

In 2012, Suzlon signed an Expression of Interest with the government of Karnataka to develop 2500 MW of wind power in the state between 2012 and 2017.

About 
Suzlon cluster is among the planet's leading renewable energy solutions supplier that's revolutionising and redefining the means property energy sources are controlled across the world. Presence in seventeen countries across Asia, Australia, Europe, Africa and therefore the Americas, Suzlon is powering a greener tomorrow with its sturdy competencies in renewable energy systems. Suzlon’s in depth vary of sturdy and reliable products backed by its fashionable R&D and quite twenty years of experience are designed to confirm optimum performance, higher yields and most come back on investment for the purchasers.

Headquarters 

The philosophy that guides Suzlon's unique activities to save the environment, build up communities, and promote responsible progress is sustainable development. Suzlon's corporate headquarters are located at One Earth - Pune, one of the greenest corporate campuses in the world and a Platinum LEED accredited and GRIHA 5 star site. The campus was opened in 2009. One of the most well-known companies in the world in the field of renewable energy, The Suzlon Group has pioneered the use of sustainable energy sources. They wanted their new headquarters to reflect their belief that a physical workplace should blend into the natural environment. Famous Indian historical landmarks like Fatehpur Sikri and the Meenakshi Sundareshvara Temple Complex in Madurai were significant design inspirations for Suzlon One Earth. On these campuses, open and enclosed spaces are cleverly mixed in a clustered design. Both contain flat, sturdy elements connecting the complexes and draw attention to elements emphasizing sacred sites and quadrants. The concept of having water bodies on these reference campuses was carried over to Suzlon One Earth.

The building is constructed by one of India's highly decorated architects Prof. Christopher Benninger who has won the Indian Institute of Architects’ Annual Award for Excellence six times, more than any other architect.

Project information 

Address:  Pune, Maharashtra, India

Rating system: LEED BD+C: New Constructionv3 - LEED 2009

Last certified on: March 1, 2010

Certification level: Platinum

Suzlon One Earth, a project that has established numerous precedents concerning energy efficiency, water management, harvesting, and waste treatment systems for developing countries, has propelled India onto the international green map.

Suzlon Energy Limited promised to build India's greenest office. The three-story structure is situated on 10.5 acres. Wind turbines (80%) and conventional and building-integrated solar panels (20%) are used to produce 5% (154 kilowatts) of the energy used there each year. One Earth is a zero-energy project because Suzlon's off-site wind turbines produce all the balance energy needed for the campus. 90% of the workstations have daylight and exterior views thanks to the design, which takes cues from vernacular architecture while preserving the environment and culture. This allows people to take in the seasons and weather and feel connected to the time of day. Light and cross-ventilation are permitted through aluminum louvers, which serve as a protective skin. Solar water heating and LED lighting systems both conserve energy. While all rainwater is collected, all sewage grey water is recycled in flushing, gardening, and air conditioning systems. The subterranean parking space may be ventilated and visually connected to all floors by glass exhaust vents with tropical plants.

Site and Site Context 
The benefits of a developed area were factors in choosing the project site. Due to its position, the building has easy access to urban infrastructure, public transportation, and established infrastructure for the supply of power and water.  The site for the project was chosen after careful consideration to meet not only the physical requirements of the company but also all the criteria for a genuinely Green project in a city like Pune, which is a little task, but a site in Hadapsar seems to fulfill all the requirements and is opposite the well-known Magarpatta city. The site had the advantage of being located within an already-developed area planned by corporate offices and residences. Located in the city of Pune or a site area of around 10 acres and a built-up area of around 75,000 square meters, the project was completed in 2009. It cost around rupees 280 crore rupees which is approximately equal to 63 million U.S. dollars

This long one at campus accommodates approximately 2500 employees. It is one of the few campuses in India that uses 100% renewable energy. The name on earth is dedicated to our precious planet and reinforces the belief that coexistence and responsible use of natural resources is the only way to achieve sustainability. The name One earth is designed to draw attention to the fact that we have only one earth, and we need to preserve it for a sustainable future. In keeping with the one-hour theme, the names of the functional blocks and the campus represent the five renewable elements of nature: fire, water, wind, sky, and earth. The only instruction to the architect was to create a global high-technology campus in which the visitor could feel the touch and essence of being in India, leaving the motto of the company powering a greener future, the architect relied exclusively on non-toxic and recycled materials.

Design Process 
Beginning in 2005, the architect fixed the fundamental concept of a central gathering place open to the sky, starting the design and building process. The campus had an upscale atmosphere thanks to it; it took the shape of a secret garden.

The main area is designed as a garden, which is emphasized by the water streams that descend in the shape of a waterfall and end in a pool of water. The central court's enormous water feature contributes to better air quality and evaporative cooling. An obelisk, also known as a Deepastambha, stands in the middle of this pool and is emphasized by many lighting. The group of glass chimneys is yet another recognizable aspect of this property. They are three in number and draw air from the cellars. Virtual instances of axial arrangement are the Deepastambha, the waterfall and glass chimneys, and the central corporate atrium, all arranged in a line. These serve as the campus's focal points.

The Corporate Atrium's large circular enclosed glass garden, from which the water of the grounds emanates and flows, mimics the concept of the courtyard. These components are among the few that support the concept of a Green Building complex by reflecting the idea of a Land Scraper instead of a Skyscraper.

Making it a Zero Energy Project 
The school saves 65% of its energy by using LED open-air lighting systems. Nearby photovoltaic panels and wind turbines generate 8% of the campus's annual energy needs at a yearly cost of about 11%. It is a Zero Energy Project since 92% of energy is obtained through renewable sources. These elements have allowed the campus to receive the Teri Griha 5 Star and Leed Platinum certifications. No other structures have a certificate from LEED so high. Large organizations need to start embracing sustainability, and the world progressively realizes that. They also need to design their structures with environmental sensitivity.

Transit 
While adequate parking space has been allocated to facilitate the large number of staff who use the campus, the One Earth campus, which includes the office complex and the corporate learning center, can house about 2500 people. As a result, a smooth and efficient transportation system was an essential factor in the design. Initiatives have also been initiated to reduce emissions from the use of automobiles. The idea was to reduce personal transport requirements and use alternate transportation. Initiatives for sustainability, such as carpooling, were strongly promoted. The company bus service for one-earth employees provides pickups from convenient locations around the city. The project has also offered easily accessible parking spaces near entry gate lobbies in the basement of the building. 5% of the total vehicle parking capacity is marked as dedicated parking for carpooling. The parking lot for the scene has been designated and branded preferential parking places, and 96 E charging outlets in the basement can service more than 3% of the building's residents.

Water Efficiency 

As part of Suzlon One Earth Campus's efforts to conserve water and increase water efficiency, water-efficient fixtures that use gathered rainwater and processed greywater cut water usage by more than 50%. High-efficiency irrigation technology uses recycled site water and captured rainwater to reduce potable water consumption for site irrigation by 50%. Recycled grey water is used for flushing irrigation, and HVAC systems, a rainwater treatment plant, and a sewage treatment plant have all been installed on-site. The landscape makes use of the Pebble drain concept, where all extra water from the podium's heart surface is discharged onto a Pebble drain. To stop soil erosion and collect extra water, drainage mats have been placed beneath every soft landscaping section on the stage. The goal of the project was to increase building water efficiency. These high-efficiency fixtures have been installed, such as dual flush toilets, urinals with hydronic urinal electronic sensors for automatic flushing, efficient flow plumbing fixtures pressure reducing devices, and water-conserving shower heads reusing storm water and greywater, which further reduces the burden on municipal water supply by reducing the demand for potable water and reusing waste water. The services for nonpotable uses, such toilet and urinal flushing, have also been connected with mechanical systems and custodial purposes. Different native or naturalized species with shallow water requirements and upkeep make up the landscape design. The use of native plants in the landscaping has helped to cut the need for irrigation by roughly 18%. By creating appropriate habitats for birds and butterflies, it aims to increase biodiversity in addition to taking into account the functional and psychological needs of humans. The ability of various native plant species to adapt to the soil and temperature of the area has been taken into consideration. The water usage of air conditioners has been cut by around 50% by using recycled or captured rainwater. Effective water chillers were chosen to achieve this. The projected amount of potable water needed for a cooling tower in the water-cooled chillers. For process water used in air conditioning systems, the view of storm water or grey water generated on the property has also been taken into consideration. An STP, a sewage treatment facility with a daily capacity of 120 kiloliters, is used to treat all wastewater produced in the buildings, including that from the kitchens, restrooms, and washing areas, to tertiary standards. The cleaned water is appropriate for flushing and HVAC uses in the landscape.

These are some of the statistical data of reduction in water consumption at Suzlon one earth

 65% reduction in building water consumption by use of low flow fixtures is achieved
 55% of water is recycled and reused within the campus
 50% reduction in landscape water consumption was attained by planting native species of trees and shrubs and by using efficient irrigation systems

Energy Efficiency 

The Suzlon One Earth campus uses only renewable energy sources. Off-site wind turbines supply roughly 93% of the total energy used. The 18 on-site hybrid wind turbines, solar panels, and photovoltaic cells supply the remaining 7% of the energy. About 154 kilowatts of energy are used in this structure. Most building facades face North, South, Northwest, or Southeast due to the blocks' orientation. This makes layer control and proper tail illumination possible. Increasing the use of daylight is one of the most important energy-saving strategies. A building's thermal efficiency is maximized by its building envelope. By minimizing the heat load and maximizing daylight harvesting, it lowers the building's energy needs. In brief occupancy places like cafes, gyms, and employee lounges, systems like indirect evaporative cooling have been employed to help maintain acceptable temperatures of roughly 25 degrees Celsius and avoid the need for air conditioners. This has assisted in lowering the project's overall air conditioning requirement by about 300 tonnes. Contrary to the building's traditional ducted system, fresh air is pulled into the basement through sizable vents and pushed by a programmable logic controller panel. Dual-speed jet fans in the basement's center are controlled by the PLC. An exhaust fan collects the bad air at ten spots and blows it onto the terrace level. The CO2 sensors' signals, which can only operate when necessary and so further reduce electricity use, are used to control the functioning of the fans.

Ozone depletion is an issue brought on by the stratospheric presence of large quantities of chlorine and bromine chemicals. These substances are made from halogens and CFCS chlorofluorocarbons, which are typically utilized as aerosol propellants and cooling agents in air conditioners and freezers due to ozone layer depletion. As more UV radiation reaches the earth, it harms living things. When it comes to humans, UV radiation causes skin cancer. By reducing phytoplankton productivity, it also has an impact on other aquatic creatures. The one earth initiative aims to stop the destruction of the ozone layer by using CFC-free refrigerants in all HVAC systems. Additionally, there are no CFCs in the fire suppression systems.

Materials and Resources 
Any project that seeks to be sustainable must prioritize reducing the trash that is typically produced throughout the construction process. The effective segregation, packing, and diversion of building waste for recycling to the proper vendors or channels was quantified as part of a construction waste management plan for one earth, which avoided landfilling dumps. Additionally, cardboard, metal, brick, acoustic tile, concrete, plastic, clean wood, glass, gypsum wallboard, carpets, and insulation were all recycled in some way. On the construction site, areas were set aside for the segregated or mixed gathering of recyclable items. Recycling activities were monitored all through the building process. The company partnered with NGO Swatch for the collection of recyclable materials from the construction site. Arrangements were made for operational management of waste by installing segregated waste collected units for recyclable materials on every floor. Construction haulers and recyclers handling the chosen materials were identified. By using materials with a higher recycled content throughout the project's construction, it was hoped to lower the embodied energy of the structure and lessen the effects of energy extraction and processing. The entire energy needed to extract, process, manufacture, and convey construction materials to the site is known as extensive materials displayed energy. Materials that can be delivered within an 800-kilometer radius are referred to as regional materials. The project sought to increase demand for building materials and goods that were extracted and manufactured in the region, thereby supporting the regional economy and minimizing the environmental impacts associated with transportation. The project used about 80% of restricted materials, which is notable by any standards. Plants collected within a ten-year cycle or less generally yield materials that are quickly regenerated. The goal was to replace scarce raw materials and long-cycle renewable resources with quickly renewable ones in order to lessen their use and depletion. A little under 6% of the total cost of all the items and building materials utilized in the project were made from quickly renewable elements.

Materials such as bamboo, wool, cotton insulation, Agro fiber, linoleum, wheat board, strawboard, and cork were employed in the project's interiors and were used for the flooring skirting ceiling tiles, walls, and partitions. Encouragement of environmentally conscious forest management was one of the project's goals. Therefore, only certified wood was used to satisfy various virgin wood requirements, and efforts were made to use at least 50% of wood-based materials that are certified in accordance with the guidelines and standards set forth by the Forest You Worship Council for complete buildings and components, including structural systems. Using post-tensioned slabs, it was possible to reduce the amount of structural steel and concrete by 50% and by 75%, respectively. Siporex flash blocks were utilized to improve the building's insulation.

The zero waste policy was put into place at One Earth to guarantee efficient waste management at the source and awareness among the building's residents. In order to eliminate waste completely, the zero waste policy directs people to restructure their resource use system. Additionally, it aids in spreading the message that in order to create a green working atmosphere, resources like paper, cardboard, food, etc. should be used carefully. The essential idea that waste management begins at the individual level and that the person producing garbage should be aware of its importance is projected by the policy.

Indoor Environmental Quality 
It is well acknowledged that our built environment has an impact on people's comfort, productivity, and health. By increasing occupants' exposure to natural light, having a calming effect on the mind, and maintaining acceptable indoor air quality, a sustainable building improves the quality of the indoor environment and their working conditions. Such structures not only increase human comfort while lowering power and water usage, but they also have a favorable effect on general productivity and well-being. It is seen that a person's level of job satisfaction is influenced by how they feel about their workplace. In order to increase productivity and have a favorable psychological impact on employees, horizontal louvres were employed to let the most daylight into the office while keeping the glare and heat out. 90% of the rooms have views of the outside. It is thought that having access to a window that provides enough light and a view of the outside world benefits residents and influences how happy they are with their workplace.

Various lighting configurations foster a pleasant work environment, provide staff members control, and aid in energy conservation. Each workspace's lighting can be individually adjusted to the comfort of the users, which lowers the energy use associated with central lighting or uncontrolled lighting. One of the factors is to make sure that the indoor air quality is suitable for the building's occupants. Mechanical ventilation systems have been designed to allow 30% more fresh air to circulate indoors than is necessary, which significantly improves occupant comfort and well-being. CO2 monitoring systems are installed in higher density zones to control the inflow of fresh air by using dampeners and the treated fresh air. Carpets and composite wood with reduced toxicity levels, as well as TFA units with low VOC content paints, adhesives, and sealants, are used containers. In light of the health risks associated with workplace tobacco use, toxic housing materials were recovered, isolated, and in some cases, ventilated as well. The entire one earth campus is a strict no-smoking zone, and the management of Suzlon has eliminated its smoking policy to ensure that the global environmental concern is addressed even at the individual and corporate level. Human comfort is significantly influenced by lighting.

Over 90% of the regularly occupied spaces have individual lighting controls, which provide people choice and aid in energy conservation. However, too much can be just as unsettling as too little. Each cabin occupant has their own lighting settings, and task lighting is installed at workstations. A special effort has been made to guarantee that polluting zones, such as restrooms and copier rooms where chemicals are employed, have deck-to-deck full-height partitions with self-closing doors that suck air from the outside or from nearby occupied spaces and make up all of these places. All exhaust locations have been carefully chosen to be at least 25 feet away from fresh air intakes or air handling equipment. Copier rooms feature separate exhaust systems and adjustable air pressure so that contaminated air does not mix with the fresh air supply and air conditioning.

Gallery

See also 
 List of wind turbine manufacturers
 Wind power in India
 Christopher Charles Benninger
 Sustainability
 Sustainable architecture

References

External links 

 

 
Electrical engineering companies of India
Companies based in Pune
Wind turbine manufacturers
Engineering companies of India
Indian companies established in 1995
Multinational companies headquartered in India
Indian brands
1995 establishments in Maharashtra
Manufacturing companies established in 1995
Companies listed on the National Stock Exchange of India
Companies listed on the Bombay Stock Exchange